Raffaello Ducceschi (born 25 February 1962) is a former Italian race walker, who took fifth and eighth place in two Olympic Games.

Biography

Ducceschi won one medal, at individual level, at the International athletics competitions. He participated at two Summer Olympic Games (1984 and 1988), he has 11 caps in national team from 1983 to 1989.

Twice a finalist in the 50 kilometres race walk at the Olympic Games (in Los Angeles 1984 and Seoul 1988), his best result was the 1987 World Championships in Athletics, when though struck with dysentery during the race and being forced to stop along the roadside several times, he was able to reach the finish line, taking fourth place.

He was trained from 1980 to 1984 by Roberto Vanzillotta, 1985–1986 by Antonio La Torre, the first half of 1987 by Peter Pastorini, and from May 1987 to all of 1988 by Sandro Damilano in Saluzzo with Maurizio and Giorgio Damilano.

Having carried out a career as an athlete, Duccechi moved to Barcelona, Spain, where he is a professional graphic designer and teaches at the university. Since 2001 he has been practicing and teaching Fitwalking.

Statistics

National records
50 km walk: 3:44:27 ( Molfetta, 17 April 1988) until 13 August 1994

Personal bests
10 km walk (track): 40:56 ( Cittadella, 10 May 1987)
20 km walk: 1:24:55 ( Piacenza, 13 May 1984)
20 km walk (track) 1:27:28 ( Mestre, 14 April 1984)
50 km walk: 3:44:27 ( Molfetta, 17 April 1988)

Progression

50 km walk

Achievements

National titles
Ducceschi won three national championships at individual senior level.
Italian Athletics Championships
50 km walk: 1983, 1984, 1988 (3)

Honours
 CONI: Golden Collar of Sports Merit:

See also
 Italian all-time lists - 50 km walk
 Italian team at the running events
 Italy at the IAAF World Race Walking Cup
 Italy at the European Race Walking Cup

References

External links
 
 Raffaello Ducceschi at La marcia nel mondo 

1962 births
Living people
People from Sesto San Giovanni
Italian male racewalkers
Athletes (track and field) at the 1984 Summer Olympics
Athletes (track and field) at the 1988 Summer Olympics
Olympic athletes of Italy
Athletics competitors of Fiamme Oro
Italian designers
Universiade medalists in athletics (track and field)
World Athletics Championships athletes for Italy
Universiade gold medalists for Italy
Medalists at the 1987 Summer Universiade
Sportspeople from the Metropolitan City of Milan
20th-century Italian people